Ellipinion is a genus of deep-sea sea cucumbers in the family Elpidiidae. It was first described by the French marine biologist Edgard Hérouard in 1923.

Species
The following species are recognised in the genus Ellipinion:

Ellipinion alani Rogacheva, Gebruk & Alt, 2013
Ellipinion albida (Théel, 1882)
Ellipinion bucephalum Hansen, 1975
Ellipinion delagei (Hérouard, 1896)
Ellipinion facetum (Hansen, 1975)
Ellipinion galatheae (Hansen, 1956)
Ellipinion kumai (Mitsukuri, 1912)
Ellipinion molle (Théel, 1879)
Ellipinion papillosum (Théel, 1879)
Ellipinion solidum Hansen, 1975

References

Holothuroidea genera
Elpidiidae